Wilan Louis (born 1 March 1983) is a Barbadian sprinter. He competed in the men's 4 × 100 metres relay at the 2000 Summer Olympics.

References

External links
 

1983 births
Living people
Athletes (track and field) at the 2000 Summer Olympics
Barbadian male sprinters
Olympic athletes of Barbados
Athletes (track and field) at the 2002 Commonwealth Games
Commonwealth Games competitors for Barbados
Competitors at the 2006 Central American and Caribbean Games
Place of birth missing (living people)